This is a list of South American nations ranked by Gross Domestic Product (GDP) at Purchasing Power Parity (PPP) for the latest years recorded in the CIA World Factbook. The figures provided are quoted in US dollars and are 2017 estimates unless otherwise noted.

See also
 Economy of South America
 Economic growth
 Economic reports
 List of countries by GDP (PPP)

References

South America
GDP PPP
GDP PPP